Tofig Mammadov (born 10 March 1980, Sumgayit) is an Azerbaijani athlete who competes in the under 90 kg category; he was a silver medalist in the 2008 Summer Paralympics. He competed in the 2012 Summer Paralympics and was the World and European champion in 2011.

Life 

Tofig Mammadov was born on 10 March 1980] in Sumgayit, Azerbaijan SSR. He began training at a local judo school in Sumgayit at an early age. He won the gold medal at World Championships held in Brommat, France in 2006.

Mammadov was a gold medalist at the European championship held in Baku in 2007. He came in third and won the bronze medal at the São Paulo World Championships held in Brazil in 2007.

He won a silver medal at the Summer Paralympics held in Beijing, China in 2008.

In 2009, he competed at the European championship held in Debrecen, Hungary and was a silver medalist. He won a gold medal at the World Championships held in Antalya, Turkey in 2011. He also participated in the Summer Paralympics held in London in 2012.

Mammadov was awarded the Taraggi (Progress) medal by the President of Azerbaijan in 2011 for his contribution to the Paralympic Movement in Azerbaijan.

He was granted the Honorary diploma of the President award in 2016 for his service in developing the Paralympic Movement in Azerbaijan. His personal trainer was Ibrahim Ibrahimov.

Awards

References

1980 births
Living people
Azerbaijani male judoka
Judoka at the 2008 Summer Paralympics
Judoka at the 2012 Summer Paralympics
Paralympic judoka of Azerbaijan
Sportspeople with a vision impairment
Paralympic bronze medalists for Azerbaijan
Medalists at the 2008 Summer Paralympics
People from Sumgait
Paralympic medalists in judo
20th-century Azerbaijani people
21st-century Azerbaijani people